Zubayr (variants include Zubair, Zoubir or Zuberi) is an Arabic masculine name and a surname from the root Z-B-R, meaning 'strong' or 'brave'. People with that name include:

Given name
 Zubayr ibn ‘Abd al-Muttalib, founder of the Hilf al-Fudul and an uncle of Muhammad
 Zubayr ibn al-Awwam (594–656), Arab Muslim military commander
 Al-Zubayr ibn Bakkar (788–870), Arab historian

Ahmed Al-Zubair al-Senussi (born 1934), a Libyan politician and prince of the Senussi house
Zubair Ahmad Khan, living Pakistani academic and engineer
Zubair Ali Zai (1957–2013), Pakistani scholar
Zubayr Al-Rimi (1974–2003), Saudi Arabian terrorist
Zubayr Amiri (born 1990), Afghan football player
Zubayr Hamza (born 1995), South African cricketer
Zubair Hoque (born 1996), British racing car driver
Zubair Khan (Indian politician) (born 1963), Indian politician
Zubair Mahmood Hayat, Pakistani army general
Zubair Mohamed Salih (1944–1998), former Sudanese Vice President and soldier
Al-Zubayr Rahma Mansur (1830–?), Sudanese slave trader and pasha of the Egyptian Khedivate
Zubair Shah (born 1977), Pakistani journalist
Zubair Torwali, living Pakistani Dard community activist and educator
Zubaira Tukhugov (born 1991), Russian professional mixed martial artist

Surname
Aasiya Zubair (1972–2009), American television executive
Abd Allah ibn al-Zubayr (624–692), Arab military commander
Amina Zoubir (born 1983), Algerian artist
 Mohammad Zubair Khan, Pakistani economist 
 Mohammad Zubair (Pakistani cricketer),  Rawalpindi cricketer
 Mohammed Zubair (journalist), Indian journalist and fact-checker
 Muhammad Zubair Umar also known as Mohammad Zubair, Pakistani politician
 Muhammad Zubair (field hockey), field hockey player
Nabila al-Zubayr (born 1964), Yemeni writer
Qasim Zubair (born 1987), Emirati cricketer
Rabih az-Zubayr (1842–1900), Sudanese warlord
Shafia Zubair (born 1967), Indian politician
Urwah ibn Zubayr (died 713), Arab historian
Zubairi, a family name in South Asia and the Middle East
Roohi Zuberi (born 1959), Indian politician
Itrat Husain Zuberi (1910–1964), Pakistani academic
Iqbal Zuberi (1932–2002), Pakistani journalist

See also
Al-Zubayr (disambiguation)
 Zubayr (disambiguation)

Arabic masculine given names